Star Awards 2017 (also SA2017, Chinese: 红星大奖2017) is a television award ceremony which is held in Singapore. It is part of the annual Star Awards organised by Mediacorp for free-to-air channels Channels 8 and U. The Road to Star Awards 2017 was broadcast live on 26 March, and 2 and 9 April 2017. The theme for this year's Star Award is "影响 (Influence)".

The nominations for the awards were first revealed 23 January 2017, followed by the Top 10 Most Favourite Artistes on a press conference on 3 March 2017 at Marina Square. During the ceremony held live on 16 April 2017, 12 programs won at least one award, among which Best Drama Serial Hero (which received the largest count of nominations), along with The Dream Job and The Gentlemen, as well as variety series As I Hold Your Hand, were tied with the most wins for a ceremony with two.

Programme details

The Road to Star Awards 2017 (红星大奖 影聚响宴)
As part of the "3+1" format introduced exclusively this year, The Road to Star Awards 2017 is a series of three one-hour live-broadcast prelude shows leading up to the main presentation (on 16 April) itself, premiering on 26 March. Each one of the three episodes focuses on one of the award categories with invited artistes, mostly nominees, usually come to discuss the award ceremony and predicted their favorites for the acting categories. The end of each episode also reveal the current standing for the Top 10 Most Favorite Artistes award, and the bottom four artistes (per each category) at the close of the third episode were eliminated from running of the award, a first in Star Awards history.

Winners are listed first, highlighted in boldface.

Episode 1 – Drama (红星大奖 影聚响宴 第一场)
The theme for Show 1 focuses on drama, and artistes – mainly the performance category nominees, were invited to the preludes and asked to select their favourites for the acting categories. Andie Chen was the artistes' choice for Best Actor and Best Supporting Actor, while Zoe Tay and Paige Chua were the picks for Best Actress and Best Supporting Actress, respectively.

The nominee was absent from the show.

Episode 2 – Variety (红星大奖 影聚响宴 第二场)
The theme for Show 2 is variety, focusing on the variety and info-ed awards, as well as awards sponsored by the show's brands, Bioskin and London Choco Roll. During the show, Quan Yi Fong was the artistes' choice for the Best Programme Host. In one segment, the variety hosts also compared awards they have won so far.

The nominee was absent from the show.

Episode 3 – Stardom (红星大奖 影聚响宴 第三场)
In the third and final week of preludes, Kate Pang replaced Pornsak as co-host, since the latter took leave. The All-Time Favourite Artistes, Quan Yi Fong, Elvin Ng and Joanne Peh were interviewed by Dennis Chew with a series of quick-fire question and answer segment; Peh, who pre-recorded her acceptance speech in anticipation of her labour of her second child, provided the funniest answer when asked to share her "favourite body part" of husband Qi Yuwu. South Korean actor So Ji-sub made an appearance at the end of the episode, who was tasked to unlock the briefcase containing the envelopes for the shortlists for the 40 artistes still running for the Top 10 Most Popular Artiste award.

Star Awards 2017 Awards Ceremony (红星大奖2017 颁奖典礼)
The awards ceremony was held on 16 April 2017 at the MES Theatre @ Mediacorp. The ceremony was hosted by Lee Teng and featured a total of 16 international presenters and performers.

Winners are listed first, highlighted in boldface.

Special Awards

This award is a special achievement award given out to artiste(s) who have achieved a maximum of 10 popularity awards over 10 years. Top 10 winning years all three of recipients were awarded are highlighted in boldface, while years with only one recipient winning are highlighted in italics. The award will not be presented in 2018, as there are no recipients with ten Top 10 Most Popular Male or Female Artistes award wins to allow the award to be presented that year.

Top 10 Most Popular Artistes
This year's Top 10 Most Popular Artistes awards sees the number of nominees expanded by eight – four per gender – to 48, the second time to expand such number since 2011 (which had 21). As usual, viewers voted for their favourite artiste through telepoll and online voting (each weighing 50% of the results). At the end of the preludes, the top 20 artistes for each gender advanced to the main presentation to vie for the Top 10 awards. Voting for the awards opened at noon on 4 March and ended at 8:30 pm on 16 April.

The nominees are listed in telepoll line order. The results of the Top 10 awards are not in any rank order.

Key

Multiple Nominations

Dramas & Programmes with multiple nominations

Dramas & Programmes with multiple awards

Presenters and Performers
The following individuals presented awards or performed musical numbers.

Presenters

Performers

Ceremony information

Award Information
The ceremony featured a "3+1" format, with broadcast of three prelude episodes (which focused mostly on technical awards and discussions prior to the actual ceremony.
As such, this was the first ceremony since 2009 to have only one ceremony.
This marked the first time nominated dramas featured infomercials similar to Tanglin (the first nominated drama to do so was The Truth Seekers).

Consecutive and records in award categories, first in Top 10
Hero marked only the second time the drama has received more than four nominations for a particular category. The first such occurrence was in 2009 where The Little Nyonya received five for a category; coincidentally, both occurrences were under the Best Supporting Actress category.
Terence Cao and Cheng Xiao Ying has by far the longest absence by any returning artiste at a gap of 19 and 16 ceremonies, having last nominated in 1998 and 2001, respectively.
Eight artistes were nominated for the Top 10 for the first time, which were Bonnie Loo, He Yingying, Hong Ling, Seraph Sun, Sora Ma, Andie Chen, Cavin Soh and Desmond Ng.
Chen Hanwei was tied with Xie Shaoguang on winning the most number of Best Actor wins, with five.
Star Awards was tied with NKF Charity Show on winning the most number of Best Variety Special wins, with seven.
The nominations for the Best Drama Serial saw records:
You Can Be an Angel Too became the tenth series to receive more than one nomination for the category.
C.L.I.F. became the first series to receive a fourth nomination for the category, surpassing The Unbeatables and The Journeys three. C.L.I.F. 4 Best Drama Serial loss to Hero meant it set a record for most nominations for the category without winning Best Drama Serial.

Changes to award categories
The Top 10 Most Popular Artiste saw many changes on this year's ceremony:
The categories were now emphasized with the use of online voting, first seen for voting for Toggle such as Favourite Male and Female Character, and Favourite Onscreen Couple awards. Said awards were also suspended due to the change.
This was the second ceremony to have an increased number of nominations for each category, with 24 (the first time occurred was in the 2011 ceremony, where there got 21 nominees). 
A similar situation will later occur again on the 2021 ceremony, with 30 nominees. 
This was also the first time nominees were eliminated midway during the voting period before the actual ceremony, which occurred during the third Prelude episode, leaving the usual 20 nominees per category running for the Top 10 award on the actual day.
However, the 2000 ceremony was de facto the first ceremony a nominee was removed during the voting period (Erica Lee was disqualified because of a contract violation).

Absence of award categories
Top Rated Variety Programme and Top Rated Drama Serial awards were suspended due to a switch in measuring television viewership.
Backstage awards (Best Set Design, Best Cameraman and Best Editing), along with the Rocket Award were neither mentioned for unknown reasons.
Although Channel 8 News & Current Affairs already had more than ten news presenters as of 2017, neither Best News Presenter nor Best Current Affairs Presenter awards were presented for the fourth consecutive ceremony.
The Best Newcomer award was also not presented for the second consecutive ceremony because of the lack of minimum candidates. The award would return again in 2018.

Star Awards 2018 nominations
The 2017 ceremony won the Best Variety Producer in the ceremony next year. However, due to the absence of the Best Variety Special category for the first time since 2000, Star Awards ended its 11-show streak of being nominated since the 2006 ceremony.

References

Star Awards